Nicolae Breban (born February 1, 1934, in Baia Mare, Maramureș County, Transylvania, Socialist Republic of Romania) is a Romanian novelist and essayist of partial German descent.

Biography
He is the son of Vasile Breban, a Greek Catholic priest in the village of Recea, Maramureș County. His mother, Olga Constanţa Esthera Breban, born Böhmler, descended from a family of German merchants who emigrated from Alsace-Lorraine. In 1951, he was expelled from school on account of his social origin when in the penultimate year at the „Coriolan Brediceanu” High School in Lugoj. He worked as an office clerk in Oradea, and finally passed the graduation exams at the „Oltea Doamna” High School. As he intended to study at the Polytechnical Institute, he had to work first as an apprentice at the "23 August” Works in Bucharest. He enrolled in the Faculty of Philosophy by „forging personal documents” as he candidly admitted in Confesiuni violente ("Violent Confessions"). His reading of Nietzsche and Schopenhauer made him, in fact, suspicious in the eyes of Dean Athanase Joja. He made his literary debut in „Viaţa studenţească” (no. 5, May 1957), with the sketch Doamna din vis ("The Lady in the Dream").

At the 10th Congress of the Romanian Communist Party, held between 6 and 12 August 1969, he was elected a substitute member of the Central Committee. Beginning with issue no. 20 of 14 May 1970, he was editor-in-chief of the literary review România literară, around which he attracted some of Romania's most important writers. In 1971, the première of the movie Printre colinele verzi/Among the Green Hills (written and directed by Nicolae Breban), the film version of Sick Animals, took place. The communist authorities were quite annoyed by this movie, but it was nevertheless included in the official selection for the International Festival of Cannes. While in Paris, Nicolae Breban remained shocked by the so-called "July Theses”, by means of which Nicolae Ceauşescu, following the Maoist model, was trying to start some kind of Cultural Revolution. The writer publicly repudiated the cultural policy of the Romanian regime in a number of interviews published in the Western media, and, in protest, resigned his position as editor-in-chief of "România literară”. Back home, in 1972, the communist authorities regarded him as an outcast. He was therefore marginalized, watched by the police, and not allowed to travel abroad again until 1975, despite having also acquired German citizenship that year. Without actually becoming an exile, he lived mostly in Paris with his wife, Cristina, between 1986 and 1989. He returned to Romania, and in 1990 launched a new series of the literary review "Contemporanul. Ideea europeană". On 24 October 1997, he became a corresponding member of the Romanian Academy, and on 14 January 2009, a full member.

Published works

Novels
 Francisca, 1965
 În absenţa stăpânilor (When the Masters are Away), 1966
 Animale bolnave (Sick Animals), 1968
 Îngerul de gips (The Plaster Angel), 1973
 Bunavestire (The Annunciation), 1977
 Don Juan, 1981
 Drumul la zid (The Back to the Wall), 1984
 Pândă şi seducţie (Still hunt and Seduction), 1991
 Amfitrion (Amphitryon), vol. I, Demonii mărunţi/The Lesser Demons, vol. II, Procuratorii/The Procurators, vol. III, Alberta, 1994
  Ziua şi noaptea  (The Day and the Night), 1998
  Voinţa de putere  (The Will to Power), 2001
 Puterea nevăzută  (The Unseen Power), 2004
 Jiquidi, 2007
 Singura cale (The Only Path), 2011

Novels translated in other languages
 Franciska, translated by Huszár Sándor, Bucharest, Irodalom Könyvkiádó, 1968
 Franciska, translated by Ivan Krstev Vlah, Sofia, Profizdet, 1968
 Franciska, translated by Jurij Koževnikov, Moscow, Progress, 1969
 Franciska, translated by Juozas Vaisnoras, Vilnius, Vaga, 1970
 Franciska, translated by Janis Bunduls, Riga, Liesma, 1971
 Kranke Tiere (Sick Animals), translated by Georg Scherg, Bucharest, Kriterion, 1973
 When the Masters are Away (Ebbi en Kvinna med karaktär), translated by Barbro Andersson into Swedish, René Coeckelberghs' Publishing House, 1975
 When the Masters are Away (En l'absence des maîtres), translated by Virgil Tănase into French, Paris, Publishing House Flammarion, 1983
 Annunciation (L'Annonciation), translated by Dorina Radu and Marcel Péju, Paris, Publishing House Flammarion, 1985
 Don Juan, translated by Marcel Péju and Daniel Pujol, Paris, Publishing House Flammarion, 1993
 When the Masters are Away (In assenza dei padroni), translated by Maria Floarea Pop, Siena, Edizioni Cantagalli, 2013

Short stories
 Orfeu în infern (Orpheus in the Underwold), 2008

Essays, diaries
 Confesiuni violente (Violent Confessions), 1994
 Riscul în cultură (Taking Chances in Culture), 1997
 Spiritul românesc în faţa unei dictaturi (The Romanian Spirit Facing Dictatorship), 1997
 Stricte amintiri literare (Rigorous Literary Memoirs), 2001
 Sensul vieţii (Memorii I-IV) (The Meaning of Life), 2003–2007
 Friedrich Nietzsche, Maxime comentate (Commented Morals), 2004
 Vinovaţi fără vină (Innocent Culprits), 2006

Plays
Bătrâna doamnă şi fluturele (The Old Lady and the Butterfly), 1984
Culoarul cu şoareci (A Corridor Ridden with Mice), 1990 (the première of the play is performed at „Vasile Alecsandri” National Theater in Iaşi in 1993)
 Ursul şi ştiuca (The Bear and the Pike), 2000

Poems
Elegii parisiene (Parisian Elegies), 1992
 Gesänge, 2021 - Übersetzt von Christian W. Schenk, mit Kupferstichen von den Erste deutschen Künstlern, XVI-XVIII, Dionysos Verlag, Boppard am Rhein Germany, Erste deutsche Ausgabe,

Translation
 Rainer Maria Rilke, Duino Elegies, 2006; 2008

Filmography 
(as screenplay writer)
Răutăciosul adolescent (A Woman for a Season) (directed by: Gheorghe Vitanidis), 1969

(as screenplay writer and director)
Printre colinele verzi (Among the Green Hills, the film version of Sick Animals), 1971

Awards
 The „Ion Creangă” Award of the Romanian Academy (1965)
 The Romanian Writers' Union Award (1968)
 The Romanian Writers' Union Award (1994)
 The Romanian Writers' Union Award „Opera Omnia” (2000)

Further reading
 Marian Victor Buciu, Breban. Eseu despre stratagemele supravieţuirii narative (Breban. An Essay on the Stratagems of Narrative Survival), Craiova, Editura Sitech, 1996
 Laura Pavel, Antimemoriile lui Grobei. Eseu monografic despre opera lui Nicolae Breban (The Antimemoires of Grobei. A Monographic Essay on the Oeuvre of Nicolae Breban), Bucharest, Editura Didactică şi Pedagogică, „Akademos”, 1997, the 2nd edition, Bucharest, Editura Ideea Europeană, 2004
 Liviu Maliţa, Nicolae Breban, micromonography, Braşov, Editura Aula, colecţia „Canon”, 2001
 Dicţionarul scriitorilor români (The Dictionary of the Romanian Writers), edited by Mircea Zaciu, Marian Papahagi, Aurel Sasu, A-C, Bucharest, Editura Fundaţiei Culturale Române, 1995
 Dicţionarul esenţial al scriitorilor români (The Essential Dictionary of the Romaniana Writers), Bucharest, Editura Albatros, 2000
 Dicţionarul general al literaturii române (The General Dictionary of the Romanian Literature), edited by: Eugen Simion, A-B, Bucharest, Editura Univers Enciclopedic, 2004
 Dicţionar analitic de opere literare româneşti (Analytical Dictionary of Romanian Literary Works), edited by: Ion Pop, final edition, Cluj, Casa Cărţii de Ştiinţă, 2007

References
 Interview by Edgar Reichmann, in „UNESCO Courier”, June, 1995
  Laura Pavel, in „Apostrof”, no. 10, October 2005
  Ion Simuţ,  in „România literară”, no. 40, October 12, 2007
   Review by Gabriel Dimisianu, in „România literară”, no. 8, February 29, 2008

External links
 Revista Contemporanul
 Editura Polirom
 Contemporary Romanian Writers

1934 births
Living people
20th-century Romanian novelists
Romanian male novelists
Romanian magazine editors
Romanian essayists
Romanian translators
Titular members of the Romanian Academy
Romanian dissidents
Romanian people of German descent
People from Baia Mare
20th-century translators
Male essayists
International Writing Program alumni
20th-century essayists
20th-century Romanian male writers
România Literară editors